Nelli Voronkova (born 30 June 1972) is a Belarusian hurdler. She competed in the women's 400 metres hurdles at the 1996 Summer Olympics.

References

1972 births
Living people
Athletes (track and field) at the 1996 Summer Olympics
Belarusian female hurdlers
Olympic athletes of Belarus
Place of birth missing (living people)